DTLA may refer to:

Downtown Los Angeles, the central business district of Los Angeles, United States 
DTLA (TV series), 2012 gay television series
Digital Transmission Content Protection, a Digital Transmission Licensing Administrator
Đồng Tâm Long An F.C., (DTLA FC), Vietnamese football club based in Tân An